Nievo may refer to:
Ippolito Nievo (1831–1861), Italian writer, journalist and patriot
Stanislao Nievo (1928–2006), Italian writer, journalist and director
Ippolito Nievo (naval destroyer), one of the eight Italian destroyers in the Rosolino Pilo-class